Foot Fella is a fictional character from the fictional planet named Marchoon. He appears in an educational figure for children learning about environmental and social issues such as global warming, lack of access to clean water, and world peace.

Campaigns

The character has been involved in plenty of campaigns including Earth Hour, Meatless Monday, Meatless Monday, World Water Day, Fairtrade Fortnight, Earth Day, World Environment Day, World Water Week, Peace One Day, World Vegetarian Day, World Animal Day, World Vegan Day, and World Car Free Day.

In April 2014, Foot Fella was involved in Mind Your Footprint's Earth Hour campaign. The campaign officials created a children’s activity book, featuring the character, in which benefits of switching off the lights were explained. They teamed up with World Wide Fund for Nature and the Eco-schools Initiative to promote the campaign through free e-distribution of this book. Then, he teamed up with his friend the Panda from WWF and visited a local school in north of London to award prizes to the children there who had taken part in a drawing competition linked to the campaign.

In June 2014, Foot Fella was involved in the World Environment Day campaign in association with United Nations Environment Programme. The book featuring Foot Fella was published explaining the problems of Small Island Developing States (SIDS). The book was freely available in electronic form to schools which are part of the Eco-Schools initiative.

See also

 Environmentalism
 Eco-Schools
 Earth Day

References

External links
 

Environmental protection
Foot
Fictional characters introduced in the 2000s